Alathur block is a revenue block in the Perambalur district of Tamil Nadu, India. It has a total of 39 panchayat villages.

References
 

Revenue blocks of Perambalur district